Nadeshicon is a Japanese culture / anime convention held in April in Quebec City, Quebec, Canada at Université Laval (Laval University), in the Alphonse-Desjardins and Maurice-Pollack buildings. The convention is run and organized by Club Animé Québec (CAQ), an extracurricular student association and nonprofit organization. It is recognized as one of the main Japanese cultural events in the city. Like most other anime conventions, Nadeshicon's events, attractions and activities include a Dealer's Room and an Artists Alley, anime screenings, panels and workshops, AMV contests, game shows, cosplay events (Masquerade, Fashion Show, etc.), and video games stations (Gaming Room).  A part of the convention is also dedicated to cultural Japanese activities.

Programming
Like most other anime conventions, Nadeshicon's events, attractions and activities include a Dealer's Room and an Artists Alley, anime screenings, panels and workshops, AMV contests, game shows, cosplay events (Masquerade, Fashion Show, etc.), and video games stations (Gaming Room).  A part of the convention is also dedicated to Japanese cultural activities.

Art:  a Dealer's Room and an Artists Alley
Cosplay events: Masquerade, Fashion Show, etc.
Gaming: Video games stations (Gaming Room)
Merchandise: 
Music: 
Panels and workshops: 
Saturday Night Dance:
Video screenings: Anime music video|AMV
Other attractions:

History
Nadeshicon had its beginnings with a single day celebrating Japanese culture in April 2009, which included a sushi dinner, a Japanese teacher sharing her experiences while living in Japan, and Calligraphy demonstrations. This event was held at the CAQ (Club Animé Québec) located at Université Laval and was followed the following year by the first Nadeshicon festival.
In 2011, soon after CAQ became a non-profit organization, the festival was given its official name, Festival Nadeshicon, which mixes Popular Japanese Culture (ex: anime, masquerade) and Traditional Japanese culture(dance, martial arts, religion, cuisine, calligraphy, etc.)

Event history

References

External links
 http://www.nadeshicon.ca/ Nadeshicon official website (fr)
 Nadeshicon on Facebook (fr)
 Nadeshicon on Twitter (fr)
 http://www.clubanimequebec.ca/ Website of Club Animé Québec (fr)

Anime conventions in Canada
Culture of Quebec
Tourist attractions in Quebec City